Electrical cell may refer to:

 Electrochemical cell, a device which produces electricity through chemical reactions, commonly referred to as a battery
 Solar cell, a device which produces electricity from sunlight
 Electrolytic cell, a device which decomposes chemical compounds through electrolysis